Sliedrecht is a town and municipality in the western Netherlands, in the province of South Holland.

Sliedrecht is known for the many large dredging companies (including Boskalis and IHC Merwede) that come from it. The Dredging Festival takes place in Sliedrecht every two years. The first IKEA store in the Netherlands opened in Sliedrecht in 1978, but it closed in 2006. Sliedrecht is also the site of the Nationaal Baggermuseum (National Dredging Museum) - featuring dredging and salvage.

Topology

Dutch topographic map of the municipality of Sliedrecht, June 2015

Public transportation
Sliedrecht railway station and Sliedrecht Baanhoek railway station are situated on the Geldermalsen–Dordrecht railway.

Waterbus route 2:
Dordrecht Merwekade - Dordrecht Hooikade - Zwijndrecht Veerplein - Papendrecht Veerdam - Papendrecht Oosteind - Hollandse Biesbosch - Sliedrecht  Middeldiep

Notable people 

 Jan Rudolph Slotemaker de Bruïne (1869–1941) was a Dutch politician and theologian
 Wina Born (1920–2001) was a Dutch journalist and writer of cooking books 
 Aad Nuis (1933–2007) was a Dutch politician and political scientist
 Bas van der Vlies (1942–2021) was a retired Dutch politician and teacher
 Jorien van den Herik (born 1943) is a Dutch business man, Chairman of Feyenoord Rotterdam 1992/2006
 Joop Hartog (born 1946) is a Dutch labour economist and academic

Sport 
 Henri Wijnoldy-Daniëls (1889–1932) was a Dutch fencer, team bronze medallist at the 1920 and 1924 Summer Olympics
 Johan de Kock (born 1964) is a former Dutch football central defender with 449 club caps  
 Daniël Mensch (born 1978) is a Dutch rower, team silver medallist at the 2004 Summer Olympics

See also
Niemandsvriend

Gallery

References

External links
Official website
Nationaal Baggermuseum

 
Municipalities of South Holland
Populated places in South Holland
Alblasserwaard
Drechtsteden